Sussanne Khan, formerly known as Sussanne Roshan (born 26 October 1975), is an Indian interior and fashion designer. She is the former wife of actor Hrithik Roshan. Her father is actor Sanjay Khan.

Biography 
Sussanne Khan was born to Sanjay Khan and Zarine Katrak Khan on 26 October 1975, in Bombay, as the third child in their family; a family rich with film artists and fashion designers including her father, Sanjay Khan who was a prominent actor in the 1980s. Her mother, Zarine Katrak is also an actress as well as an interior designer. Her father is of mixed Afghan and Iranian descent while her mother comes from a Parsi family. She has 2 elder sisters and a younger brother.

Her younger brother, Zayed Khan is also an actor who works in Bollywood. Farah Khan Ali who was born as the eldest child out of the four is a jewelry designer and Sussanne's second sister, Simone Khan, is an interior designer.

She is the niece of late actor Feroz Khan and director Akbar Khan (brothers of Sanjay Khan) and first cousin of Bollywood actor, Fardeen Khan.

Career 
After obtaining an Associate of Arts degree in interior designing in 1995 from Brooks College in the US, Khan started her career as an interior designer in 1996 by following the footsteps of her mother who was also a well-known interior designer during her active career.

In 2011, she partnered with fellow interior designer and a well recognised film producer, Gauri Khan, to launch and introduce The Charcoal Project foundation in Mumbai, which is the first interior fashion design store in India. The Charcoal Project is also considered as the most popular design store in India.

She worked for The Label Life, an e-commerce fashion lifestyle company established in 2012. She was employed as the first interior fashion designer for the company.  In 2014, she launched the official branch of Pearl Academy campus in Mumbai and supporting the students of the academy by handling scholarships.

Personal life 

Khan married Hrithik Roshan in 2000 after dating for four years. The couple ended their 13-year-old relationship in 2013 and got divorced a year later, after having two sons. However, they still remain close friends and spent the lockdown during 2020 together with their sons. She was involved in the Dragon fly club raid in December 2020. In May 2022, Sussanne Khan shared a photo with boyfriend Arslan Goni, confirming their relationship.

References

External links

1978 births
Living people
Indian women fashion designers
Artists from Mumbai
Indian people of Pashtun descent
Indian people of Afghan descent
Indian people of Iranian descent
Parsi people from Mumbai
Indian Muslims
Indian Shia Muslims
Indian women designers
21st-century Indian designers
Women artists from Maharashtra
People from Mumbai